Maotai is a town in the north of Guizhou province, known as the production site of maotai wine and located on the southeast (right) bank of the Chishui River (赤水河). It is under the administration of Renhuai City, it has five residential communities (社区) and eight villages under its administration.

The village is most famous as the origin of the eponymous brand of baijiu. The liquor is one of the most universally popular in China. Maotai is the only alcoholic beverage presented as an official gift by Chinese embassies in foreign countries and regions, and it received worldwide exposure when Zhou Enlai used the liquor to entertain Richard Nixon during the state banquet for the U.S. presidential visit to China in 1972.

References

Towns in Guizhou